Alejandro Ariel Cabral (born September 11, 1987) is an Argentine footballer.

Club career

Vélez Sársfield
Cabral started his playing career in 2007 with Vélez Sársfield, during Ricardo La Volpe's coaching era. Despite playing in the youth system as an attacking midfielder, he has mostly played in the first team as a centre midfielder. Cabral was part of Vélez' 2009 Torneo Clausura winning team, playing 5 games.

For the entire 2010–11 season, Vélez loaned Cabral to Legia Warsaw, for a fee of USD 150,000 and a buyout price of USD 2 million. Cabral showed considerable promise early on (scoring against Arsenal FC in a pre-season friendly and being called up to the senior national team). The Argentine midfielder played 40 minutes (including the extra time) in the final of the 2010–11 Polish Cup and scored on the penalty shootout. Winning the Polish Cup, Legia secured its right to play in the 2011–12 Europa League qualifying games. At the end of the season the club decided not to make use of the buyout clause and Cabral returned to Vélez Sársfield.

Upon his return, Cabral was relegated from Vélez's first team by Víctor Zapata. However, initially due to the latter's injuries, he started seeing more action during the first half of 2012, playing 15 games during the 2012 Clausura and 9 during the 2012 Copa Libertadores.

After Zapata's departure from the team in June 2012, Cabral established himself as a regular starter, playing all 19 games (and scoring twice) of Vélez's 2012 Inicial championship-winning campaign. The midfielder fractured his tibia in 2013 and was left out of the squad for the entire Torneo Final and Copa Libertadores, causing Vélez to obtain the loan of Fernando Gago as his replacement. He returned to Vélez first team in 2014 and was a starter in the 2013 Supercopa Argentina victory against Arsenal de Sarandí.

Cabral scored his last goal for Vélez in a 2–0 victory against Crucero del Norte for the second fixture of the 2015 Argentine Primera División and played his last game against Unión de Santa Fe, in a 1–2 defeat for the seventh fixture of that championship. His contract with the club ended in June 2015.

Cruzeiro
In 2015, Ariel Cabral was traded to then Campeonato Brasileiro Serie A Champions Cruzeiro as a replacement to Lucas Silva, sold to Real Madrid. Ariel quickly became one of the main players of the team's midfield, praised by fans for his cerebral style of play, being extremely competent both defensively and offensively, creating plays with magnificent passes even though his main task is defensive.

In Cruzeiro, Cabral was part of what became known as "La Banda", along with former Vélez Sarsfield star Lucas Romero and Uruguay wonderkid Giorgian De Arrascaeta.

International career
Cabral played for the Argentina national under-20 football team that won the 2007 FIFA U-20 World Cup in Canada. He played the last minutes of the final game against Czech Republic.

Called by Sergio Batista, the midfielder made his debut for the Argentina national football team on 1 June 2011 in a 1–4 defeat to Nigeria, soon followed by another appearance in a 1–2 defeat to Poland.

Career statistics

Club

International appearances and goals

Honours

Club
Vélez Sársfield
Argentine Primera División (3): 2009 Clausura, 2012 Inicial, 2012–13 Superfinal
Supercopa Argentina (1): 2013

Legia Warsaw
Polish Cup: 2010–11

Cruzeiro
Copa do Brasil: 2017, 2018

International
Argentina U-20
FIFA U-20 World Cup: 2007

References

External links
 
 Profile at Vélez Sarsfield's official website
 Argentine Primera statistics at Futbol XXI  
 
 

1987 births
Living people
Footballers from Buenos Aires
Argentine footballers
Argentina international footballers
Argentina under-20 international footballers
Association football midfielders
Club Atlético Vélez Sarsfield footballers
Legia Warsaw players
Cruzeiro Esporte Clube players
Goiás Esporte Clube players
Argentine Primera División players
Ekstraklasa players
Campeonato Brasileiro Série A players
Campeonato Brasileiro Série B players
Argentine expatriate footballers
Expatriate footballers in Brazil
Argentine expatriate sportspeople in Brazil
Expatriate footballers in Poland
Argentine expatriate sportspeople in Poland